Harold Douglas Kermode (18 July 1922 – 19 August 2009) was a Canadian basketball player. He competed in the men's tournament at the 1948 Summer Olympics.

Personal life
Kermode served in the Royal Canadian Air Force during the Second World War.

References

External links
Harry Kermode's obituary

1922 births
2009 deaths
Basketball players at the 1948 Summer Olympics
Basketball people from British Columbia
Basketball position missing
Canadian men's basketball players
Olympic basketball players of Canada
Sportspeople from Nanaimo
UBC Thunderbirds basketball players
Royal Canadian Air Force personnel of World War II